Sumner Township is located in Warren County, Illinois, United States. The village of Little York is located in this township.

Geography

Demographics
As of the 2010 census, its population was 572 and it contained 262 housing units.

References

External links
 City-data.com
 Illinois State Archives

Townships in Warren County, Illinois
Townships in Illinois